The RockTigers (also written as The Rock Tigers, The Rocktigers) were a South Korean rock and roll band from 2001 to 2013. The RockTigers had a style that was rooted in the 1940s and 1950s jump blues, boogie-woogie, and rockabilly that sets them apart from other Korean indie bands.

Background
They branded their style of music as "kimchibilly" to represent their Korean take on the style, referring to Korea's representative food kimchi, and for years held monthly "Kimchibilly Nights." The term was coined by a foreign fan of the band.

Although not part of the Korean mainstream, The RockTigers have developed a cult following, especially among the expat community and tourists, with their energetic live shows around the Hongdae club scene.

Discography

Studio albums
 Come On Let's Go (2003)
 Oldies But Goodies (2007)
 Taste The Kimchibilly (2008)
 Rock 'N' Roll Licence (2010)
 Rockabilly Coaster (2010) (Japan only)
 Electric Travel (2011)
 Shut Up And Deal (2013)

Compilations
문화사기단 합동음반 제1호/Culture Fraud Company Compilation No. 1 (2002) "Sex Machine"
문화사기단 크리스마스 컴필레이션/Culture Fraud Company Christmas Compilation (2002) "Leather Bike Jacket Boy"

Members 

Velvet Geena - Vocals
Tiger - Guitar 
Roy - Double bass 
Eddie Tarantula - Guitar

References

External links
 Official band website

Musical groups established in 2001
Musical groups disestablished in 2013
South Korean indie rock groups
South Korean rock music groups
Rockabilly music groups